Arthur Wong Ngok-Tai (born July 2, 1956) is a nine time Hong Kong Film Awards-winning cinematographer, actor, screenwriter, film producer and film director.

Career
As a cinematographer, Wong was inspired by his father, who was, himself, a renowned cinematographer of the 1950s and the 1960s in Hong Kong. Arthur is in the board of directors for the Hong Kong Film Awards Association, Vice-Chairman of the Federation of Hong Kong Filmmakers, founder and Honorary Chairman of HKSC (Hong Kong Society of Cinematographers) and Honorary Advisor (Film And Television) to the Vocational Training Council of Hong Kong.

Arthur Wong is known for uses of simultaneous multi-camera filming, the first to film in High Definition in Asia, and holds a record of the only person winning 3 consecutive years in the Hong Kong Film Awards, twice.

Wong started his career in 1976 and participated in more than 130 movies as a cinematographer, some of which were directed by the likes of John Woo, Ringo Lam, Sammo Hung, Jackie Chan, Yuen Woo-Ping, Ann Hui, Clara Law, Peter Chan, and Tsui Hark.

Filmography

Cinematography
 Shaolin Mantis (1978)
 Heroes of the East (1978)
 Dirty Ho (1979)
 Fists and Guts (1980)
Man on the Brink (1981)
 Life After Life (1982)
 Crimson Street
 Aces Go Places 2 (1983)
 Comedy (1984)
 Heart of Dragon (1985)
 The Strange Bedfellow (1986)
 The Millionaire's Express (1986)
 Mr. Vampire Part 2 (1986)
 Evil Cat (1986)
 Armour of God (1987)
 Vampire's Breakfast (1987)
 Eastern Condors (1987)
 Miracles (1989)
 A Chinese Ghost Story 2 (1990)
 Armour of God II: Operation Condor (1991)
 Once Upon a Time in China (1991)
 Spiritually a Cop (1991)
 A Kid From Tibet (1992)
 Once Upon a Time in China II (1992)
 Dragon Gate Inn (1992)
 The Moon Warriors (1992)
 Twin Dragons (1992)
 Days of Tomorrow (1993)
 Iron Monkey (1993)
 Once Upon a Time in China IV (1993)
 The Black Panther Warriors (1993)
 Temptation of a Monk (1993)
 Love and the City (1994)
 The Returning (1994)
 A Confucian Confusion (1994)
 A Touch of Evil (1995)
 The Adventurers (1995)
 Somebody Up There Likes Me (1996)
 Tristar (1996)
 Big Bullet (1996)
 Beyond Hypothermia (1996)
 God of Gamblers 3: The Early Stage (1996)
 The Soong Sisters (1997)
 Hitman (1998)
 Sleepless Town (1998)
 Knock Off (1998)
 Purple Storm (1999)
 Gen-X Cops (1999)
 2000 AD (2000)
 Visible Secret (2001)
 Double Vision (2002)
 Truth or Dare: 6th Floor Rear Flat (2003)
 The Medallion (2003)
 The Floating Landscape (2003)
 Magic Kitchen (2004)
 Bamboo Shoot (2004)
 Ultraviolet (2006)
 Silk (2006)
 The Warlords (2007)
 Painted Skin (2008)
 The King of Fighters (2009)
 Bodyguards and Assassins (2010)
 East Wind Rain (2010)
 Here Comes Fortune/Fortune King is Coming to Town (2010)
 A Chinese Fairy Tale (2011)

Writer
 Fists and Guts (1980)

Producer
 The Floating Landscape (2003)

Director
 The Fool Escape (1980)
 In the Line of Duty 3 (1988)
 Ulterior Motive (2015)

Actor/Cameo Appearance
 Viva Erotica (1996)
 Beast Cops (1998)
 Born Wild (2001)
 Demi-Haunted (2002)
 Truth or Dare: 6th Floor Rear Flat (2003)
 Infernal Affairs II (2003)
 Silk (2006)
 Here Comes Fortune/Fortune King is Coming to Town (2010)
 Gangster Payday (2014)

Awards and nominations

Wong is the only person winning a "double triple", awarded best cinematography for 3 consecutive years twice in the Hong Kong Film Awards.

References

External links
 

Hong Kong cinematographers
Hong Kong film directors
Hong Kong male actors
Hong Kong writers
Hong Kong screenwriters
Living people
1956 births